16 Regiment Royal Artillery is a regiment of the Royal Regiment of Artillery in the British Army. It currently serves in the air defence role and is equipped with the Sky Sabre air defence missile system. One of its Sky Sabre Batteries is always deployed to the Falkland Islands.

History
The regiment was established in 1947 when 2nd Coast Regiment Royal Artillery was retitled 16 Coast Regiment Royal Artillery. As 16 Light Air Defence Regiment it was deployed to Borneo in 1965. It undertook tours in Northern Ireland during the Troubles in 1970, 1972, 1973, 1974, 1976, 1979, 1988 and 1993 and 14 Battery took part in the Falklands War in 1982. It was posted to Rapier Barracks at Kirton in Lindsey in 1985, seemingly swapping with 12th Air Defence Regiment Royal Artillery.

The regiment was posted in Napier Barracks in Dortmund in 1992 and renamed 16th Regiment RA in 1993 whilst based there. It was relocated back to Centaur Barracks at Woolwich in England in 1995 and 14 Battery was deployed to the Maze prison and West Belfast at the end of the summer in 1996. The working garages at Centaur Barracks were replaced with Napier Lines which were sited alongside the main hub RA barracks in 1998.

The regiment then deployed to South Armagh to start its final tour of Northern Ireland in 1998. A UN tour to Cyprus marked the start of the new millennium.

In August 2007, the Regiment relocated to St George's Barracks in Rutland from Woolwich. Its departure from the Royal Artillery Barracks, where the Royal Regiment of Artillery had been based since 1716, was marked with a ceremony on 25 July 2007. In July 2014 the Regiment moved to Baker Barracks, Thorney Island.

The Regiment was part of the 2012 London Olympics Air Security Force, deploying Rapier FSC Ground Based Air Defence (GBAD) systems as part of Exercise Olympic Guardian.

Role
Previously it also provided the now out of service Counter Rocket, Artillery, and Mortar C-RAM and Automated Sense & Warn (AS&W) Urgent Operational Requirement (UOR) capabilities on Operation TELIC (Iraq) and Operation HERRICK (Afghanistan) respectively.

In January 2021, the regiment began training with the new Sky Sabre air defence missile system which would be replacing Rapier.

Batteries
The unit has the following batteries:
11 (Sphinx) Battery Royal Artillery - Sky Sabre Battery
14 (Cole's Kop) Battery Royal Artillery - Sky Sabre Battery
20 Battery Royal Artillery - Headquarters Battery
30 Battery (Rogers's Company) Royal Artillery - Sky Sabre Battery
32 (Minden) Battery Royal Artillery - Sky Sabre Battery

References

External links

  Official site

Royal Artillery regiments
Air defence regiments of the British Army
Military units and formations established in 1947